Shriya Saran Bhatnagar (born 11 September 1982) is an Indian actress who works predominantly in Telugu, Tamil, and Hindi-language films. Although Saran aspired to become a well-known dancer, she became an actress with her film debut in 2001 with the Telugu film Ishtam, and had her first commercial success with Nuvve Nuvve (2002).

Saran subsequently appeared in several more Telugu films alongside Hindi and Tamil films. In 2007, she starred in Sivaji, the highest-grossing Tamil film at that time. She also gained critical acclaim for her role in the Hindi film Awarapan (2007). In 2008, Saran played the lead role in her first English film, the American–Indian co-production The Other End of the Line. Her following projects included popular films such as Kanthaswamy (2009) in Tamil and Pokkiri Raja (2010) in Malayalam—roles that established her as one of the leading actresses in the South Indian film industries . In 2012, Saran starred in Deepa Mehta's Midnight's Children, an English adaptation of Salman Rushdie's novel of the same name, for which she received international critical acclaim. She achieved further commercial success by starring in films such as Pavitra (2013) and Chandra (2013). In 2014, Saran starred in the critically acclaimed Telugu film Manam, which brought her accolades for her performance.

In addition to her work in films, Saran has been the brand ambassador for brands across India, endorsing beauty and health products. Among other philanthropic activities, she has volunteered for charity organizations. In 2011 she opened a spa employing exclusively visually challenged people. She was also the brand ambassador for Celebrity Cricket League for its first two seasons.

Early life
Shriya Saran Bhatnagar was born on 11 September 1982 in Haridwar in Northern India, to Pushpendra Saran Bhatnagar and Neeraja Saran Bhatnagar. Her father worked for Bharat Heavy Electricals Limited and her mother was a chemistry teacher in Delhi Public School, Ranipur in Haridwar and Delhi Public School, Mathura Road, New Delhi. Saran completed her schooling from both schools where her mother had taught. She has an elder brother named Abhiroop who lives in Mumbai. Saran's mother tongue is Hindi.

Her family lived in the small town of BHEL colony in Haridwar when she was growing up. She later studied at Lady Shri Ram College in Delhi and received a Bachelor of Arts degree in literature.

Saran is an accomplished dancer. She was first trained as a child by her mother in Kathak and Rajasthani folk dance, and later trained in the Kathak style by Shovana Narayan. She was involved with many dance teams in college and with her teacher. They would incorporate social issues into their dance routines.

Career

Early career (2001–03)
While in her second year at the LSR College in Delhi, Saran got her first opportunity to appear in front of the camera for a video shoot. Following her dance teacher's recommendation, she was invited to appear in the music video of Renoo Nathan's "Thirakti Kyun Hawa". Shot in Banaras, the video was seen by Ramoji Films who offered her the lead role of Neha in their film Ishtam. Saran accepted the part and, even before it was released she was signed to four more films, including Nuvve Nuvve, in which she played a millionaire's daughter who falls for a middle-class man. In 2002, she starred in Santosham, co-starring Nagarjuna, Prabhu Deva and Gracy Singh, which was her first commercial success. The film took the Nandi Award for Best Feature Film and Filmfare Best Film Award (Telugu). Saran played a woman who lets someone she loves go with another, but wins him back later in life. For her performance, she earned a nomination for the CineMAA Award for Best Actor- Female, giving her a good foothold in the Telugu industry in the early part of her career.

In 2003, Saran acted in a supporting role in her first Hindi film, Tujhe Meri Kasam, starring debutants Ritesh Deshmukh and Genelia D'Souza in leading roles. She  performed as one of the  lead female roles in Telugu film  Tagore, along with Jyothika and Chiranjeevi which was screened at the International Indian Film Academy Awards, and was a commercial success. She followed it with her Tamil film debut in Enakku 20 Unakku 18, alongside Tarun and Trisha Krishnan, which was simultaneously shot in Telugu as Nee Manasu Naaku Telusu, in which she played a football coach. Though she acted in films in three languages that year, eight of the first ten films of her career were in Telugu.

Career fluctuations (2004–07)
In 2004, Saran acted in two Telugu and two Hindi films, including Arjun and Nenunnanu, where she played a student in classical singing. She had ten 2005 releases, nine of which were Telugu films, the most notable for her being Chatrapathi. There she appeared opposite Prabhas and earned her first nomination for the Filmfare Best Telugu Actress Award. Meanwhile, she tried to make her comeback in Tamil with Mazhai,a remake of the Telugu film Varsham, where she reprised the role done by Trisha in the original. Neither the movie nor her performance were received well. Also in 2005, she appeared as one of only three characters in the film Mogudu Pellam O Dongodu, which was about a married couple's first night together, and made a guest appearance in a children's film called Bommalata, which won the National Film Award for Best Feature Film in Telugu. Saran's only lead role in 2006, excluding three special appearances, was in the Tamil film Thiruvilayadal Arambam.

In 2007, she was chosen to play the lead female role opposite Rajinikanth in S. Shankar's Sivaji: The Boss after Aishwarya Rai rejected the role due to busy schedules. which was the most expensive Indian film at that time. R.G. Vijayasarathy wrote in his review for Rediff that, aside from her beauty, Saran "proves that she can act too". Her performance earned her a South Scope Style Award for Best Tamil Actress, her first award win, and a nomination at the Vijay Awards. The role made her a star in the south Indian film industry. During this phase of her career, she made several special appearances in item numbers, including in the films Devadasu, Munna, and Tulasi.

Also in 2007, Saran made her comeback in Hindi cinema with Awarapan, which was a joint production between India and Pakistan. She played a Muslim woman and had to learn Urdu. This was her fourth Hindi film, but the others had failed to make any impact. Sanjay Ram, writing for Business of Cinema, gave the film 2.5 of 5 stars and said that Saran provided a brief, compelling performance. Saran later said that the film strengthened her conviction that all religions are equal. Later that year she appeared in one more Tamil film, Azhagiya Tamil Magan, opposite Vijay. Though critics exalted her looks, her performance received mixed reviews, with one reviewer, Nandhu Sundharam of Rediff, going so far as to say that her "acting is as bad as her looks are good". That same year Saran made a special appearance in a scene in the Kannada film Arasu. She appeared in six films in 2007 in four languages.

American cinema debut (2008–12)

In 2008, Saran made her American cinema debut in Ashok Amritraj's The Other End of the Line. She played the role of Priya Sethi, who works as a telephone operator in an Indian call centre, while acting alongside Jesse Metcalfe, Anupam Kher and Tara Sharma. Shriya's performance was praised by critics, particularly her on-screen chemistry with Jesse Metcalfe. John Anderson, writing for Variety magazine, said it was "a winning Stateside debut for beautiful Indian actress Shriya Saran."

Saran acted in the Hindi film Mission Istaanbul with Zayed Khan, and Shabbir Ahluwalia in 2008. She played the character of Anjali Sagar which was inspired by the character of Romila Dutta played by Preity Zinta in the film Lakshya, a journalist who desires to have a child with her husband, which leads to their separation, since he is reluctant. Bollywood Hungama critics said that her character was wasted, as again she gets very little screen time. However, she did pick up the Stardust Exciting New Face Award.

Her most important 2009 release was the commercially successful Tamil film Kanthaswamy, alongside Vikram. She earned a nomination at the Vijay Awards. Vikram said in an interview that her role was on par with his, and she easily stole the show on most occasions. Of her character in the film, Saran said that it was the best she has done so far. Also that year she appeared as the female lead in Thoranai. A reviewer said that her glamour and the songs were the only high points of the film. For Thoranai and Kanthaswamy together, she received her third award win, the Amrita Mathrubhumi Award for Best Actress. She then appeared in another English film, Cooking with Stella, which is a comedy that takes a look at the serious nature of relationships between servants and employers. It was selected for the Toronto International Film Festival, which Saran attended.

In 2010, Saran made her Malayalam debut with Pokkiri Raja, in which she appeared opposite Mammootty and Prithviraj. The film broke the record in Malayalam cinema for opening week gross income, though it was not received well critically. It was said of Saran that all she had to do was look pretty. She then enacted her first lead role in a Telugu film after five years, in the commercially successful action-comedy Don Seenu opposite Ravi Teja, where she plays the sister of a mobster. In the opinion of some critics, she stole the show with her dances and romantic scenes.

The year 2010 was her second busiest after 2005, having appeared in eight films, this time in four languages.

In 2011, Saran appeared in Rowthiram, where she worked with Tamil actor Jiiva for the first time. The film received fairly low reviews. Although some reviews said that Saran was not given much opportunity to show her acting skills, mainly just adding a romantic touch to a mostly violent film, she was referred to by another as the pivot around which the film revolves. Her performance earned her Best Actress Award at the International Tamil Film Awards. Her only other film in 2011 was a special appearance in a song for the Tamil film Rajapattai.

Saran's first release of 2012 was her second Malayalam project, Casanovva, co-starring Mohanlal and directed by Rosshan Andrrews. The movie was delayed many times, and it was rumored that Saran would leave the project, but in October 2010, the producer of the film announced that shooting would commence in Dubai with Shriya Saran among the cast. It was released on 26 January. Her next release was in Gali Gali Mein Chor Hai, from director Rumy Jafry, which began shooting in September 2011, and released on 3 February. She then was seen in the critically average comedic Telugu film Nuvva Nena, with actors Allari Naresh and Sharwanand, followed by Sekhar Kammula's much delayed Life is Beautiful. 

Saran has starred in Deepa Mehta's long delayed English project Midnight's Children, which is based on Salman Rushdie's highly acclaimed novel of the same name. It was filmed under the working title of Winds of Change. It was screened at several film festivals in late 2012 in Canada and finally made its general release in India on 1 February 2013.

2013–present

In early 2013, Saran appeared in an item number in the film Zila Ghaziabad. This was her first item number in a Hindi film. On 7 June, Saran's Pavitra was released, in which she played a prostitute. At a press conference in Hyderabad, she said that the film is very special for her, and that she was touched by the sensitivity that director/writer Janardhana Maharshi gave to the topic. Her bi-lingual film Chandra, directed by Roopa Iyer, was simultaneously made in Kannada and Tamil languages. She played the role of a princess in the film opposite Kannada actor Prem Kumar. The film released in Kannada on 27 June 2013, and in Tamil on 14 February 2014. It became a moderate success at the Kannada box office. The film marked Saran's return to Tamil cinema after more than five years.

Saran's first film of 2014, released 23 May, was the Telugu family drama Manam, which was a success in India and America. Saran's first film of 2015 was Gopala Gopala, a remake of the Bollywood blockbuster OMG – Oh My God!, released in the January festive season. She will next appear in director Karan Bhutani's Hindi film Valmiki Ki Bandook, which is currently under production. She appeared opposite Ajay Devgan in Drishyam, a remake of the Malayalam film of the same name, which turned out to be a box office success. In mid-January 2016, she made a special appearance in Nagarjuna's Oopiri, while also signing for her next Hindi film Tadka, opposite Nana Patekar. In May 2016, she was cast as a female lead in the Telugu-language epic historical action film Gautamiputra Satakarni.

Other works
In 2003, Saran hosted the 50th Filmfare South Award with actor R. Madhavan. She was a part of Tamil director Mani Ratnam's stage show, Netru, Indru, Naalai, an event which sought to raise funds for "The Banyan", a voluntary organisation which rehabilitates homeless women with mental illness in Chennai. She was one of the guests alongside actor Surya Sivakumar at the season 3 finale of TV dance show Maanada Mayilada.

Saran was the first actress, and the third celebrity after Shah Rukh Khan and Aamir Khan to deliver a lecture to students at the Indian Institute of Management Ahmedabad (IIM-A) on 12 February 2010. She said that "The Indian media and entertainment industry is the fastest growing sector at present, so considering this IIM Ahmedabad had started a new program CFI – Contemporary Film Industry – A Business Perspective. I was there to give a lecture to 2nd year students of CFI and did a lot of research for the lecture for nearly five days." She held a lecture on the marketing and branding of a film. In 2011, she gave a lecture to students at the Indian Institutes of Technology (IIT) Madras on the history of films, and films as a medium of cultural exchange.

Endorsements
Saran started her modelling career by acting in a Pond's Creams advertisement. She then did a Coca-Cola advertisement alongside Tamil actor Vijay, which was directed by prominent director Rajiv Menon. She also starred in a Fair & Lovely creams advertisement during her early career. Shriya Saran is also appointed as brand ambassador for Pantene Shampoo. In 2007, she became the brand ambassador of Saravana Stores. She is now the brand ambassador of the Lux and Head & Shoulders. Saran was also signed as brand ambassador along with actor Saif Ali Khan for Brooke Bond Taj Mahal Tea. Saran says no to soft drinks advertisements because she feels that soft drinks may harm children's health. In 2011, Saran was appointed as the promotional model for McVitie's by United Biscuits along with actress Bipasha Basu. In 2013, Saran was appointed as brand ambassador for Colgate Active Salt Healthy White toothpaste, along with Bollywood actress Kareena Kapoor. In 2014, she was signed as brand ambassador for Karnataka Milk Federation(KMF).

In 2007, Saran launched the first issue of Galatta Cinema and has been featured on its cover many times. In 2008, she was featured in, and appeared on the cover of the June issue of Maxim India. Editor Anup Kutty said: "We had been thinking of getting someone who bridges this strange divide we have between the North, South and the West ... Shreya fit the bill perfectly." She has appeared on various other magazine covers over the years, including Jade and South Scope. In 2012, she again did a photo shoot for Maxim India.

CCL (Celebrity Cricket League)

On the sports front, Saran is brand ambassador of Celebrity Cricket League (CCL), a concept that mixes two passions in India, film and cricket. In April 2010, she danced with Shah Rukh Khan at the fourth season opening ceremony of the Indian Premier League (IPL), another cricket league.

Personal life
Saran has always been very reluctant to talk about her private life, and usually denied that reported linkups are romantic in nature.
Saran is well known for her charity work. She describes herself as someone used to "sharing time and resources with the underprivileged since childhood." She says that "celebrities can show the way by sensitising people to social issues, campaigning for causes or being part of fund-raisers." Her family has always encouraged her to think of the needy.

Saran is a brand ambassador for the Naandi Foundation, and for the Save A Child's Heart Foundation (SACH), which works for the benefit of poor children and people affected by natural calamities. She helps finance a Prevention of Aids foundation. In 2009, Saran joined with other eminent personalities to promote 'The Joy of Giving Week', to encourage people from all walks of life to engage in acts of giving. She regularly participates in carnivals and campaigns that associate with children benefits. She is associated with animal welfare and the Blue Cross of India. She is also associated with an NGO called World Vision that finds parents for deprived kids, and works for Apollo's RDF to raise funds for underprivileged children.

In 2011, she opened a Spa which exclusively employs the visually challenged. It is called Shree Spa, and is located in Mumbai. Saran has said "When I studied in DPS Mathura Road in Delhi, there was a school for blind exactly opposite to our school. I used to go there every week and spend time seeing how these students played cricket and did other things normally. That is what inspired me to do something for these people". In an interview to TOI, the actress said: "We feel sympathetic towards them, but we never employ them. We are scared because we have not grown up with them. While these people might be visually impaired, their other senses are very strong. So they can effectively give foot and back massages and treatments like reflexology. It's important to understand that you are not doing a favour on them but they are doing a favour on you".

On working in regional film industries in India she has stated: "I don’t consider Kollywood or Bollywood as separate entities. For me, there's only a single category, the Indian film industry, which is extremely rich owing to its diverse genres and languages." She is fluent in Hindi, English, and can understand Telugu and Tamil well. On 19 January 2013, she quit Twitter due to derogatory comments from her followers. However, she rejoined Twitter with a new account on 27 January 2015. 

On 19 March 2018, she married her Russian boyfriend Andrei Koscheev at her Lokhandwala residence. On 12 October 2021, Shriya Saran announced on her social media platform that she and her husband had a daughter, born on 10 January 2021.

Awards and nominations

 Honours and recognitions
 2010 – T. Subbarami Reddy Lalitha Kala Parishath Awards for Contributions to Telugu Cinema
 2010 – Featured in a poll conducted by Rediff about woman achievers in Indian entertainment, ranking her among the top actresses

 2014 – GR8 Women's Award

 Rankings on The Times of India'''s list of "50 Most Desirable Women": 13th in 2010, 15th in 2011, 18th in 2012, 7th in 2013, 5th in 2014 and 6th in 2015
 Rankings on Hyderabad Times'' most desirable woman for south, 3rd in 2013, 2nd in 2014, 2nd in 2015
 Brand Ambassador for SIIMA AWARDS in 2013, 2014 and 2015 respectively.
2019 - Santosham Sridevi Smarakam Award for Contributions to Tollywood at 17th Santosham Film Awards.

References

External links

 
 
 

1982 births
Living people
People from Haridwar
Actresses in Telugu cinema
Actresses in Tamil cinema
Actresses in Hindi cinema
Actresses in Kannada cinema
Actresses in Malayalam cinema
Delhi University alumni
Indian Hindus
Delhi Public School alumni
Indian film actresses
21st-century Indian actresses
International Tamil Film Award winners
Actresses from Dehradun
South Indian International Movie Awards winners
Santosham Film Awards winners